Viva Voce was an American indie rock band from Portland, Oregon, formed by Kevin Robinson and Anita Robinson. Their music drew on several influences including psychedelic rock, classic rock, folk and R&B.

History
The Robinsons formed Viva Voce in 1998 in their native Muscle Shoals, Alabama and later relocated to Nashville and then the Portland area in 2003. Their first album, Hooray for Now, was released in 1998. The band formed their own label, Amore!Phonics, and released Lovers, Lead the Way! in 2003 in conjunction with Asthmatic Kitty Records. The follow-up, The Heat Can Melt Your Brain, was released in 2004 and received positive critical response and heightened exposure for the band.

Broadening their fanbase worldwide, Viva Voce toured extensively in Europe after signing with UK indie label Full Time Hobby. They toured with The Shins and Jimmy Eat World. Their fourth album, Get Yr Blood Sucked Out, was released August 21, 2006 in Europe and September 12, 2006 in the USA. After playing their final show of 2007 on September 6 during MusicfestNW, Kevin announced that Viva Voce would be working on their new album and would continue touring in 2008.

For the 2009 album Rose City, two more band members were hired for touring, Evan Railton and Corrina Repp.

Viva Voce's sixth, and final, studio album, The Future Will Destroy You, was released on June 21, 2011 on Vanguard Records. It received positive reviews from numerous music outlets. Paste Magazine gave the album a 7.2 out of 10.

The band split up in 2013 when Kevin and Anita divorced.

Discography

Albums 
 Hooray for Now – (1998, Cadence)
 Lovers, Lead the Way! – (2003, Asthmatic Kitty)
 The Heat Can Melt Your Brain – (2004, Minty Fresh)
 Get Yr Blood Sucked Out – (2006, Barsuk Records)
 Rose City – (2009, Barsuk Records)
 The Future Will Destroy You – (2011, Vanguard Records)

Singles and EPs 
 Weightless (CD) – 2000
 Scissors and Blue Series, Vol. 3 (split w/ Soul-Junk) (CD) – Velvet Blue Music 2002
 Live at KEXP (CD) – Amore!Phonics, 2004
 Alive With Pleasure (double 7-inch & 7-inch vinyl) – Full Time Hobby, 2005
 Center of the Universe (double 7-inch) – Full Time Hobby, 2005
 Wrecking Ball (7-inch vinyl) - Full Time Hobby, 2005
 From the Devil Himself (7-inch vinyl) - Full Time Hobby, 2006
 Faster than a Dead Horse (7-inch vinyl) - Full Time Hobby, 2006
 Viva Voce Loves You EP - Full Time Hobby, 2007

Compilation album contributions 

 "God Rest Ye Merry Gentlemen", "Jolly Old Saint Nicolas" and "What Child is This" on Love, Peace, and Joy (CD) - Cadence, 1997
 "Eye in the Sky" (Allan Parsons Project cover) on Bridging the Distance (CD) - Arena Rock Recording, 2007

References

External links
Barsuk webpage

Interview with Chicago Innervision

Music Video for "From The Devil Himself" + interview with director Moh Azima

Indie rock musical groups from Oregon
Musical groups from Portland, Oregon
1998 establishments in Alabama
Barsuk Records artists
Asthmatic Kitty artists
Vanguard Records artists